Shundeh (also Romanized as Shūndeh; also known as Shūmdeh) is a village in Sangan Rural District, in the Central District of Khash County, Sistan and Baluchestan Province, Iran. At the 2006 census, its population was 95, in 20 families.

References 

Populated places in Khash County